Jinx, in comics, can refer to:

 Jinx (DC Comics), a supervillain and enemy of the Teen Titans
 Jinx (Image Comics), a comic book series written and drawn by Brian Michael Bendis
 Jinx (G.I. Joe), a G.I. Joe character who has appeared in the comic book based on the franchise
 Jinx, a comic strip in The Beano featuring the sister of Jonah named Jinx.
 Jinx, a Marvel Comics character who was linked with the Darkhold Redeemers
 Jinx, a Marvel Comics character associated with Bishop
 Jinx Bushka, a comic strip character from Funky Winkerbean

See also
Jinx (disambiguation)

References